Andrew Francis Cannon (born 14 March 1996) is an English professional footballer who plays as a midfielder for Wrexham.

Club career

Rochdale 
Cannon made his first team debut for Rochdale on 27 September 2014, coming on as a second-half substitute for Bastien Hery in an away League One match against Leyton Orient at Brisbane Road.

On 20 May 2015, Cannon signed a contract extension at Rochdale to keep him at the club until the summer of 2017.

Cannon scored his first goal for Rochdale in a 3–2 loss to Peterborough United on 6 August 2016, and then scored his second goal for the club on 9 August 2016 in a 3–1 EFL Cup win over Chesterfield.

He was man of the match in Rochdale's 2–2 draw in the 5th round of the FA Cup against Tottenham Hotspur.

He was offered a new contract by Rochdale at the end of the 2017–18 season.

Portsmouth 
Cannon signed for Portsmouth on 2 January 2019 for an undisclosed fee reported to be around £150,000. Kenny Jackett has suggested that he sees Cannon as an attacking midfielder. Cannon was cup-tied for Portsmouth's win in the 2019 EFL Trophy Final.

Hull City
On 16 June 2021, Cannon signed a two-year deal with Hull City, the club holding an option for a further year.
He made his debut for Hull City on 7 August 2021, after coming on as a substitute in the 4–1 away win at Preston North End, scoring his first goal for Hull in extra time.

Stockport County (loan)
On 24 March 2022, Cannon moved to Stockport County on loan for the remainder of the season.

Cannon made his debut for the Hatters on 26 March as a late substitute in the club's 2–0 league victory against Eastleigh and then 3 days later on 29 March made his first start for the club and scored his first goal in Stockport's 5–0 Cheshire Senior Cup victory against Crewe Alexandra. Cannon went on to help Stockport secure promotion back to the Football League by winning the National League trophy following a 2–0 win over FC Halifax Town on 15 May 2022.

Wrexham
On 9 December 2022, Cannon signed a permanent deal with Wrexham for an undisclosed fee.

Personal life
On 21 March 2020, it was reported that Cannon had tested positive for COVID-19 during the 2020 pandemic.

On 7th September 2022, Cannon and his fiancé, gave birth to Cannon’s first child.

Career statistics

References

External links

Rochdale profile

1996 births
Living people
Footballers from Ashton-under-Lyne
English footballers
Association football midfielders
Rochdale A.F.C. players
Portsmouth F.C. players
Hull City A.F.C. players
Stockport County F.C. players
Wrexham A.F.C. players
English Football League players
National League (English football) players